The 2010 House of Representatives of the Philippines party-list election was on May 10, 2010. The whole country was one at-large district, where parties nominate three persons to be their candidates, ranked in order of which they'll be seated if elected. The elected representatives will serve in the 15th Congress.

Candidates from the district elections are not allowed to be nominated by the parties participating in the party-list election, nor are parties who have candidates in the district elections may be allowed to join the party-list election; the parties in the party-list election must represent a distinct "sector" in the society such as women, laborers and the like.

In the election, the voter elects the party, not the nominees of the party; a voter may not be able to influence how the nominees are listed on election day, except for joining the party beforehand. If the party surpasses 2% of the national vote, the person first nominated by the party will be seated. Additional seats can be won by multiplying the percentage of the votes the party got, with the difference of number of seats the party already has (1), and the number of seats allocated for sectoral organizations (57), disregarding decimals, with no party getting more than two additional seats. However, usually only the party with the most votes gets the two additional seats, the other parties will get only one additional seat. If the number of seated representatives is less than the 20% quota of party-list representatives in Congress (57 for the 15th Congress), the unfilled seats will be filled up by the remaining parties in descending order of votes garnered until are seats are filled up. Note that with more than a hundred parties participating, and with the three-seat cap, the seats that the parties with 2% of the vote or more will always be less than the 20% allocation.

Background
Prior to the election, the Commission on Elections (COMELEC) expected an increase of party-list organizations seeking accreditation from the 153 organizations that applied for accreditation during the 2007 elections. The COMELEC also de-listed 25 party-list organizations for either failing to participate in the last two elections or did not obtain two percent of the votes cast. However, the COMELEC said the two percent vote requirement does not cover the organizations that won a congressional seat based on a recent Supreme Court ruling. Militant groups Migrante and Sanlakas protested such de-listment, saying that they were not covered by the 2% rule, and that such rule is unconstitutional. Another 8 such organizations also filed a motion for reconsideration or a verified opposition against their de-listment.

After purging the party-list roster, the COMELEC then acted upon the organizations that filed their manifestations of intent to run. LGBT group Ang Ladlad appealed their disqualification after the COMELEC's First Division disqualified the organization due to "moral grounds," citing the Bible and the Qur'an. Party leader Danton Remoto, a professor at Ateneo de Manila University, cited the Universal Declaration on Human Rights and the International Covenant on Civil and Political Rights as reasons why Ang Ladlad should be re-instated. Remoto would then appeal to the commission en banc. The COMELEC also disqualified Alliance of Concerned Teachers (ACT) and government employees union Courage. The commission's First Division disqualified ACT after it had failed to prove that it exists "in most of the regions;" the commission said that, Courage on the other hand, "exists in Western Visayas, Davao del Sur, a town in Lanao del Norte and Rizal and some cities in Metro Manila," and that it failed to prove that it represents a "marginalized and under-represented sector."

In December, the commission en banc denied Ang Ladlad's motion for reconsideration with finality as Remoto said he would elevate the case to the Supreme Court. In January 2010, the Supreme Court issued a temporary restraining order to the COMELEC on disqualifying Ang Ladlad.

With the COMELEC prevented from disqualifying Ang Ladlad, the organization along with 143 others were included in the final list of accredited party-list organizations, although the status may change if the court sides with COMELEC on the issue. Under Resolution 8745, six additional party-list groups were accredited, bringing the total to 150.

The party-list election has been hit by allegations that several parties are fronts by the ruling administration. Bagong Alyansang Makabayan (BAYAN), a coalition of left-leaning party-lists, and election watchdog Kontra Daya said that nine party-lists were connected to the Arroyo political family. The parties and their first nominee cited were:

Ang Galing Pinoy, a party that claims to represents security guards: outgoing second district of Pampanga congressman Mikey Arroyo. Arroyo, the son of president Gloria Macapagal Arroyo willingly dropped his intention to run in Pampanga's 2nd district to let his mother run.
Transport group 1-UTAK: Secretary of Energy Angelo Reyes
Pilipino Association for Country – Urban Poor Youth Advancement and Welfare (PACYAW), which claims to advocate sports development in the country: former Tourism assistant secretary Janet Lazatin as its first nominee 
Kabalikat ng Mamamayan (KABAYAN)
The administration distanced itself from the six pro-government parties insisting it has not endorsed any group supposedly to augment the administration's representation in Congress, saying that "it is up to the COMELEC to judge and issue a decision on the matter."

On April 8, 2010, the Supreme Court ruled that Ang Ladlad was allowed to run in the 2010 election, saying with a unanimous vote that what is immoral is not necessary illegal.

Results
On May 31, the leading parties in the party-list election were declared by the commission as winners; deferred are the parties (not nominees) that have pending disqualification cases against them. Ang Galing Pinoy's proclamation, the party of incumbent Pampanga 2nd district representative Mikey Arroyo was recalled as Arroyo has a pending disqualification notice against him, and he is their #1 nominee. The winners were:

3 seats:
 Ako Bicol
2 seats each:
Coalition of Associations of Senior Citizens in the Philippines
Akbayan Citizens' Action Party
Gabriela Women's Party
Cooperative NATCCO Network Party
Abono
Bayan Muna
An Waray
Buhay
1 seat each:
Agricultural Sector Alliance of the Philippines
Alliance for Barangay Concerns
Butil Farmers Party
Anakpawis
Kabataan
Abante Mindanao
Alliance of Concerned Teachers
Youth Against Corruption and Poverty
Kasangga sa Kaunlaran
Bagong Henerasyon
Ang Galing Pinoy
Agbiag! Timpuyog Ilocano
Puwersa ng Bayaning Atleta
Arts, Business and Science Professionals
Trade Union Congress Party
Alyansa ng mga Grupong Haligi ng Agham at Teknolohiya para sa Mamamayan
Democratic Independent Workers’ Association
Kapatiran ng mga Nakulong ng Walang Sala
Kalinga-Advocacy for Social Empowerment and Nation Building Through Easing Poverty
Alagad
Una Ang Pamilya
Alliance of Volunteer Educators
Total seats: 41, with 16 unfilled.

Incumbents nominated by their parties are italicized; proclaimed winners are boldfaced. Seats in parenthesis indicates the number of seats to be won by the party pending disqualification cases, while parties highlighted are disqualified prior to the election.

Aftermath
On July 11, 2010, the Commission on Elections (COMELEC) disqualified two nominees of Kasangga sa Kaunlaran namely Teodoro Haresco and Eugenio Lacson on proving they do not support the marginalized sectors. Bagong Alyansang Makabayan (BAYAN) secretary-general Renato Reyes says that "this should now serve as a benchmark for other pending petitions against party-list nominees who do not belong to nor represent the marginalized sectors."

On July 20, 2010, the COMELEC allowed Rep. Arroyo to sit as the representative for Ang Galing Pinoy after he was accepted as the first nominee of the party-list group. The Commission voted 4–2 while one abstained. The COMELEC also proclaimed three more parties as winners: A TEACHER, Butil Farmers Party and 1-UTAK, although the latter's first nominee, Angelo Reyes, was not allowed to take office as he has a pending disqualification case.

While the commission upheld Angelo Reyes nomination by 1-UTAK, on late July, the party withdrew Reyes from their list after the commission's decision was appealed. Reyes, who was prohibited from having his seat at the House of Representatives, appealed to the Supreme Court. With the suicide of Reyes, the Supreme Court dismissed Reyes' petition.

The Supreme Court dismissed petition filed by the Alliance for Barangay Concerns (ABC) on their disqualification by the commission, on March 22. The commission's decision, in which ABC was disqualified for being a front of the Members Church of God International, a religious group that produces the Ang Dating Daan television program, was upheld as it stated that the constitution gave the commission the power to register and cancel the registration of party-list groups. The commission originally dismissed the petition filed by lawyer and journalist Melanio Mauricio, Jr. in 2010, but was reconsidered on August 2010; ABC has already won a seat in Congress but has not been sworn in. ABC, through its chairman James Marty Lim, argued that since the party had already won a seat, the jurisdiction should be under the House of Representatives Electoral Tribunal. However, the court ruled that commission maintains jurisdiction as the case does not refer to qualifications of members of Congress.

References

External links
Official website of the Commission on Elections

Results
Philippines 2010 Election Results - Main Site
Philippines 2010 Election Results - Alternate Site
PPCRV Map Viewer - PPCRV Encoded Site
PPCRV Map Viewer - PPCRV Site
NAMFREL - 2010 PARALLEL COUNT - NAMFREL Site
HALALAN 2010: Latest Comelec official results - ABS-CBN Site
ELEKSYON 2010: National Election Results Tally - GMA Site
ELEKSYON 2010: Regional Election Results Tally - GMA Site
The Vote 2010 Election Results Tally - Bombo Radyo Site

House
Party-list elections in the Philippines